FC Lashyn (Lashyn Taraz Fýtbol Klýby) is a Kazakhstani football club based in Taraz.

History
The club was formed in 2007 and finished 8th in its first season in Kazakhstan First Division.

Domestic history

References
The team's squad in 2010

Association football clubs established in 2009
Football clubs in Kazakhstan
2009 establishments in Kazakhstan